The Wartime Broadcasting Service is a service of the BBC that is intended to broadcast in the  United Kingdom either after a nuclear attack or if conventional bombing destroyed regular BBC facilities in a conventional war. It is unclear if the Wartime Broadcasting Service is still operational as plans are kept mainly secretly with the BBC and government officials. According to an article by the BBC, recordings of a nuclear attack warning are still re-recorded and kept up to date periodically.

Origins and history 

The origins of the service lie in pre-World War II plans to disperse BBC staff to facilities such as Wood Norton to guarantee due functioning of the corporation if cities such as London, Belfast, Cardiff, Glasgow and Edinburgh were attacked by the Luftwaffe.

In the post-war era, plans were revised so that the Wartime Broadcasting Service would have coped with a nuclear strike by installing 54 low-powered transmitters and keeping (what remained of) the main transmitter network in reserve, in case Soviet bombers used them to home in on targets. Although vague, plans from the mid-1950s were to provide both a national and regional radio service 24 hours a day (mirroring peacetime BBC operations at the time) with the objective of providing "instruction, information and encouragement as far as practical by means of guidance, news and diversion to relieve stress and strain". "Diversion" was to be in the form of music and selected pre-recorded programmes. BBC executives drafted a schedule made up of music, drama, comedy, and religious programmes to be broadcast over a period of 100 days after a nuclear attack on the United Kingdom.

The BBC had studios and production equipment at many government nuclear bunkers such as the Central Government War Headquarters at Corsham and the regional seats of government.

By the end of the decade, existing transmitters had been fitted with emergency diesel generators and fallout protection.

From the 1980s, the BBC planned to broadcast for only a few hours a day and for a few minutes each hour, the intention being to conserve the batteries in domestic radios. There was to be no entertainment content for this reason and so that official messages could get through. With the end of the Cold War, the BBC deactivated the studios and emergency transmitter networks in 1993 as surplus to requirements. Many of these studios have become exhibits in bunkers, like the Kelvedon Hatch Secret Nuclear Bunker, which have now been converted into museums.

Post-Cold War

With the Cold War having ended, the BBC and British Telecom developed the National Attack Warning System in 2003. This system was able to warn by television, radio and telephone (the latter only in some areas) of an impending attack using existing infrastructure. The BBC was capable of doing so within ten minutes using their existing broadcasting procedures. By the time of the 2011 digital switchover, this was becoming obsolete because television and radio have limited warning capability.

According to a report in the Daily Telegraph, there were suggestions that the warning message would be recorded by Jill Dando, actress Joanna Lumley or Carol Vorderman.

Under the Broadcasting Act 1980, the government still has the legal right to take over editorial control of radio and television in the event of a national emergency. Also, the BBC agreement allows the government to ask the BBC to broadcast messages in an emergency:

Operation 
The decision to activate the service would have been taken at Cabinet level late in the crisis phase. On being given the order, the BBC and ITV were to suspend normal programming, broadcast the frequencies for the Wartime Broadcasting Service and go off-air an hour later (with television used only to broadcast Protect and Survive public information films and unavailable after an attack due to its susceptibility to electromagnetic pulse). At this point, one single national programme would have been broadcast on BBC Radio 4 from Wood Norton. This would have consisted of official government announcements and information interspersed with filler material, such as music, news and warnings. The four-minute warning itself was to have been injected from a special studio at Broadcasting House and been broadcast nationally on all television and radio stations when a coded signal from RAF High Wycombe was given. This studio would also have been used by government ministers to broadcast messages and announcements until the government left London late in the crisis phase (or during the precautionary period).

After an attack, there would also have been a regional service tailored to local needs located in regional seats of government. Regional controllers were to use these smaller BBC studios to give out local messages to communities and would have been manned by BBC staff. If conventional air attacks destroyed peacetime broadcasting facilities, the Wartime Broadcasting Service would also have been activated.

Regular drills and training exercises were held to give an air of realism, but many BBC staff saw them as pointless or declined to serve during a national emergency because they would not be allowed to take their families with them. One anonymous insider said, "I can't blame them for deciding there were better ways to go than to sit in a bunker with a group of local radio engineers."

Programmes for broadcast 
Initially, a post-attack statement was to be broadcast confirming a nuclear strike had hit the United Kingdom and warning of the dangers of fallout. It would have been broadcast every two hours on all radio frequencies set aside for the BBC for the first twelve hours after the attack.  The script was released by the BBC under the Freedom of Information Act on 3 October 2008. It was recorded by Peter Donaldson, chief continuity announcer for BBC Radio 4.

Jim Black, a BBC executive, compiled a schedule consisting of classic BBC drama, comedy and religious programmes to maintain morale. These included Round The Horne, I'm Sorry, I Haven't A Clue, Hancock's Half Hour and the Rodgers and Hammerstein musical The Sound of Music. Drama programmes included The Afternoon Play and Thirty-Minute Theatre. From the 1980s until 1993, the entertainment content was dropped and only official announcements would have been broadcast in order to conserve energy.

See also 
 Four-minute warning
 Protect and Survive
 Duck and cover
 Transition to war
 BBC Radio 4 (the designated national broadcaster in a national emergency)
 Central Government War Headquarters
 Civil Contingencies Secretariat
 RAF Rudloe Manor
 Corsham Computer Centre
 Continuity of government
 Hack Green Secret Nuclear Bunker
 WGU-20
 Emergency Alert System
 Emergency Broadcast System
 CONELRAD
 Mobile phone alerts in the United Kingdom

References 
 
 File 16  Civil Defence Communications and Warning, from Subterranea Britannia accessdate=2009-10-04
 Script of the BBC's post-attack statement accessdate=2009-10-04

Notes

External links 
 BBC Radio 4 programme from 28 January 2008 about BBCs preparations for war during the 1960s–1980s .ram audio file
 BBC Radio 4 newsreader Peter Donaldson about his pre-recorded radio warning messages. YouTube video file from The Culture Show, broadcast 2 February 2008

Defunct BBC national radio stations
Cold War history of the United Kingdom
Emergency management in the United Kingdom
Emergency population warning systems
Continuity of government